Bilateral relations exist between Australia and Fiji. Both countries have a High Commission in the other.

Australia and Fiji share a strong bilateral relationship with extensive people-to-people links and important trade and investment ties.

There are regular two-way exchanges between Australia and Fiji, including under Australian Government programs such as Australia Awards, the New Colombo Plan, Australian Volunteers and the Seasonal Worker Programme. The two countries are members of the Pacific Islands Forum.

History 

Fiji and Australia share a long history, especially under the British Empire that held much of the world at its zenith. Fiji, like Australia, became a penal colony for the British empire under Queen Victoria's reign.

Fiji was a key supplier in sugar to the British penal colonies that lay in the Pacific during Queen Victoria's reign, until Fiji became independent on 10 October 1970.

Relations were strained due to Australia's condemnation of the military coup which overthrew the government of Prime Minister Laisenia Qarase in December 2006. Military leader and "interim Prime Minister" Voreqe Bainimarama accused Australia of "bullying" Fiji by applying sanctions and insisting on a swift return to a democratic government. In March 2008 the Fiji Human Rights Commission published a report which alleged that Australia might have been planning an armed intervention in Fiji in late 2006. Australian Foreign Minister Stephen Smith dismissed the allegations, and stated: "The best thing that can happen in Fiji is not spurious suggestions about Australian activity but having an election, returning Fiji to democracy, respecting human rights".

On 4 November 2009, Fijian military leader, Voreqe (Frank) Bainimarama, expelled the Australian High Commissioner James Batley and his New Zealand counterpart. He said that Australia and New Zealand had tried to undermine Fiji's judiciary and weaken its economy. New Zealand and Australia disputed key aspects of Fiji's claims. In response, Australia quickly expelled Fiji's acting high commissioner, Kamlesh Kumar Arya.

Recently a “vuvale”(meaning family) agreement was signed between Scott Morrison and Frank Bainimarama covering economic, security, cultural and sporting support.

"It's clear now more than ever that we can put this behind us in the past, letting bygones be bygones," Mr Bainimarama told reporters in Suva on Thursday.

Cooperation

Australia remains a substantial donor of foreign aid to Fiji. In 2018-19, Fiji received $58.1 million in aid from Australia. In 2021, the Australian government pledged to provide a $68 million loan to Fiji to upgrade its airports, as part of a step-up in infrastructure lending across the Pacific to help the region recover from the COVID-19 pandemic. In 2021, the Australian government also pledged approximately $2 million to support a new Super Rugby franchise named the Fijian Drua, who would compete with teams from Australia and New Zealand from 2022 onwards.

See also 

 Foreign relations of Australia
 Foreign relations of Fiji

References 

Australia and the Commonwealth of Nations
 
Bilateral relations of Fiji
Fiji
Fiji and the Commonwealth of Nations